Best of European Business (BEB) is an annual competition by Roland Berger Strategy Consultants and has been established in 2005.

Idea
The idea of Best of European Business is to award European op-companies and –managers for outstanding economical performances. European entrepreneurs as role models are awarded in the categories growth, creation of value, innovation and strategy. Every year the BEB focusses on a certain topic. In 2011 German companies have been awarded with focus on the markets of ASEAN-countries. This ceremony does not only award the European companies and managers, but also call attention on the strengths of the European economy.

Initiator and jury
Initiator of BEB is Burkhard Schwenker, Chairman of Roland Berger Strategy Consultants. The Best of European Business-Award is taking place in numerous European countries by managers of successful companies. Among the judges are Jürgen Großmann (RWE), Jean-Cryil Spinetta (Air France) or Daniel Vasella (Novartis). Numerous national and international partners of media and science are supporting Best of European Business.

Winners
2012, category "successful and sustainable business strategies in Africa":
 BASF
 Commerzbank
 Linde
 Siemens

2011:
 DHL (Success in Asia - best large corporation)
 TÜV SÜD AG (Success in Asia - best mid-sized company)
 Dieter Zetsche (Growth Strategy in Asia - best manager)
 Jochen Zaumseil (Success in Asia - best manager)

Further winners (abstract):
 Porsche (2005/2006)
 BASF (2005/2006)
 Puma (2006/2007)
 Airbus (2007/2008)
 Hochtief (2009/2010)

External links
 http://www.best-of-european-business.com (Not active anymore, 30 January 2021)

See also
List of business awards

References

Business and industry awards
European awards